You Can Tune a Piano, but You Can't Tuna Fish is the seventh studio album by REO Speedwagon, released in 1978. It was their first album to be co-produced by lead singer Kevin Cronin and lead guitarist Gary Richrath. The album was REO's first to make the Top 40, peaking at No. 29. The album sold over 2 million copies in the US, which led it to being certified 2× Platinum.

This is the first album to feature Bruce Hall on bass, replacing Gregg Philbin. In 2013, the album was released on CD by UK-based company Rock Candy Records, with expanded liner notes and photos.

The hits "Time for Me to Fly" and "Roll with the Changes" have since become two of the band's best-known songs. "Time for Me to Fly" was later covered in a bluegrass arrangement by Dolly Parton on her 1989 album White Limozeen. In 2005, the album cover was featured on Pitchfork's list of "The Worst Record Covers of All Time", and in 2014 its title was featured in NMEs list of "The 50 Worst Album Titles in History". In 2020, Netflix's Ozark TV series third season episode, "Kevin Cronin Was Here" featured "Time for Me to Fly", which resulted in the song making the top 40 on the Billboard Digital Songs Chart.

"Roll with the Changes" was featured in the 2011 movie The Cabin in the Woods.  Cash Box said that it "opens with a flowing piano riff that quickly develops into a dynamic, well-structured tune propelled by electrifying guitar licks."

"Time for Me to Fly"

The song "Time for Me to Fly" peaked at No. 56 on the Billboard Hot 100 in 1978; despite this relatively modest peak position, it has become one of the band's best-known songs, and has received airplay on FM radio over the years. According to singer Kevin Cronin, the song was inspired by his breakup with his high school girlfriend. The song would again hit the top 40 in 2020 on [[Billboard (magazine)|''Billboards]] Digital Songs Chart after it was featured on Netflix's Ozark third-season episode, "Kevin Cronin was Here." It was also used in the films Vision Quest and Grown Ups''.

Track listing

Personnel
REO Speedwagon
Kevin Cronin – lead and backing vocals, rhythm guitar, piano (track 1)
Gary Richrath – lead and rhythm guitars
Neal Doughty – piano (except track 1), Hammond organ, Moog synthesizer
Bruce Hall – bass
Alan Gratzer – drums

Additional personnel
 Lon Price – saxophone (track 9)
 Angelle Trosclair, Denise McCall, Denny Henson, Tom Kelly – backing vocals

Production
 Paul Grupp – producer, engineer
 John Boylan – executive producer

Charts

Album

Singles

Certifications

Release history

References

REO Speedwagon albums
1978 albums
Epic Records albums
Albums produced by Gary Richrath
Albums produced by Kevin Cronin
Albums recorded at Sound City Studios